Thatcher is a census-designated place in Box Elder County, Utah, United States. The population was 789 at the 2010 census.

The community was named for Moses Thatcher, an apostle for the Church of Jesus Christ of Latter-day Saints.  Thatcher was first settled in 1890.

Thatcher Mountain,  to the west, is named after the community.

Demographics
As of the census of 2010, there were 789 people living in the CDP. There were 230 housing units. The racial makeup of the town was 95.9% White, 0.5% Black or African American, 0.1% American Indian and Alaska Native, 0.1% Asian, 0.1% Native Hawaiian and Other Pacific Islander, 1.6% from some other race, and 1.5% from two or more races. Hispanic or Latino of any race were 2.4% of the population.

See also

 List of census-designated places in Utah

References

External links

Populated places established in 1890
Census-designated places in Box Elder County, Utah
Census-designated places in Utah